The 5th Field Artillery Regiment "Superga" is a field artillery regiment of the Italian Army, specializing in rocket artillery. Today the regiment is based in Portogruaro in Veneto and administratively assigned to the Artillery Command.

History 
For its conduct and work after the 1976 Friuli earthquake the 5th Heavy Self-propelled Field Artillery Group "Superga" was awarded a Bronze Medal of Army Valour, which was affixed to the group's war flag and added to the group's coat of arms.

Current Structure
As of 2021 the 5th Field Artillery Regiment "Superga" consists of:

  Regimental Command, in Portogruaro
 Command and Logistic Support Battery
 Surveillance, Target Acquisition and Tactical Liaison Battery
 Missile Launcher Group
 1st Missile Launcher Battery
 2nd Missile Launcher Battery
 3rd Missile Launcher Battery
 Technical Support Section

The Command and Logistic Support Battery fields the following sections: C3 Section, Transport and Materiel Section, Medical Section, and Commissariat Section. Each of the three missile launcher batteries fields: two MLRS sections with three M270A1 MLRS-I each, and a Fire and Support Section, which transports additional missiles on ACP-90 trucks. Each Fire and Support Section also fields a Close Defense Squad, which is equipped with VTLM Lince vehicles.

External links
Italian Army Website: 5° Reggimento Artiglieria Terrestre "Superga"

References

Artillery Regiments of Italy